The Old Caoling Tunnel is a cycleway tunnel in Gongliao District, New Taipei, Taiwan.

History
The tunnel was originally constructed as a single-track railway tunnel of Yilan line which was inaugurated in February 1924. It was then later on converted into a cycleway when the new railway tunnel was constructed in parallel with the old one. The new tunnel was opened in 1986 and the old tunnel was abandoned. Years later, the tunnel was turned into a bikeway by Northeast Coast and Yilan National Scenic Area Administration. The tunnel was then reopened on 10 August 2009.

Architecture
The cycleway path inside the tunnel was designed in a style of a track. The tunnel was originally lit with oil lamps and now is lit with fluorescent strip lights and a few low energy bulbs in replica lanterns 2020. The entrance features some artworks. The tunnel stretches for a length of 2.167 km.

Transportation
The tunnel is accessible by bus from Fulong Station of Taiwan Railways.

See also
 List of tourist attractions in Taiwan

References

1924 establishments in Taiwan
Cycleways in Taiwan
Buildings and structures in New Taipei
Railway tunnels in Taiwan
Tourist attractions in New Taipei
Transportation in New Taipei
Tunnels completed in 1924